Arturo G. Muñoz is a former Central Intelligence Agency (CIA) senior intelligence officer with three decades of analytical skills and operational experience, both in the Directorate of Intelligence (DI) and in the Directorate of Operations (DO). He managed highly classified covert-operations and HUMINT collections for the CIA National Clandestine Service in various high-ranking positions. Muñoz is highly regarded at the CIA as an intelligence officer and a psychological operations expert with countless successful programs; to include innovative covert action campaigns with verifiable impacts in Latin America, Southwest Asia, the Balkans, the Middle-East, and North-Africa. Muñoz is a well known pundit on national security, international affairs, espionage and U.S. foreign policy.

Biography
Muñoz holds a B.A. in history and Spanish literature from Loyola University; an M.A. in anthropology and a Ph.D. magna cum laude in Latin American history, from Stanford University; and A.B.D. in anthropology, from UCLA. As a graduate student, Muñoz lived with the Emberá people in Panama’s Darién Province, and the Yanomamo, conducting years of field work in Venezuela’s Upper Orinoco. As a Sierra Club activist, Muñoz lobbied in Washington, D.C. against U.S. funding for the Pan-American Highway in the Darién Gap, arguing that completion of this road would devastate the tropical forest environment, as well as its indigenous people.

Muñoz joined the CIA in 1980. In the Directorate of Intelligence (DI), he contributed to National Intelligence Estimates (NIEs): wrote for President’s Daily Brief (PDB) and National Intelligence Daily (NID); and gave well-received briefings to congressmen, policymakers and military commanders. Muñoz also pioneered the application of anthropology to intelligence in groundbreaking intel assessments on insurgencies in Latin America. As a certified Case Officer in the CIA Directorate of Operations (National Clandestine Service) Muñoz recruited and handled assets covertly, producing disseminated intelligence reports. Additionally, he implemented U.S. Military projects in Central America as Special Advisor for Counterinsurgency and Psychological Operations detailee at USSOUTHCOM. During his tenure with the CIA, Muñoz established numerous successful Special Activities Division (SAD) programs, as well as counterterrorism, counterinsurgency and counternarcotics strategies, from initial HQS planning to full-fledged field operation.

In 2009, Muñoz retired overtly from the CIA and started working in the private sector as a Senior Political Scientist. for RAND Corporation, specializing in intelligence, national security, covert-action, al-Qaeda, Afghanistan, Pakistan, Psychological Operations (PSYOP), Counterinsurgency, and Counterterrorism.

Muñoz returned to Afghanistan and Pakistan in 2009, 2010 and 2013, meeting a broad range of civilians and military officials, as well as Pashtun tribal leaders, Arbakai commanders and Taliban members. Muñoz provided new insights on enemy forces to U.S. Military and participated in advisory panel for ISAF Commander, applying analysis to operations. He supported USMC and SOCOM Afghan mission; helped improve human terrain understanding to Pashtun tribal environment; briefed/debriefed deploying Marines and Special Forces. Muñoz's PSYOP effectiveness study contributed to ongoing Pentagon reassessment of doctrine, organization and methods; stirred debate; subject of two Air Force conferences; and cited by journalists and congressional staffers. In addition to numerous performance awards and meritorious citations, Muñoz received a prestigious award from the U.S. Government in 2013 for highly classified case study, currently used as a lessons learned reference for ongoing projects.

Muñoz also spent his post-CIA career participating in diverse international endeavors; to include assisting the CIA with Releases of Unclassified Edition of Studies in Intelligence, briefing members of US Congress on various national security matters and foreign policy issues, giving speeches and interviews, writing for scholarly journals and publishing book reviews. Furthermore, Muñoz lectures on "Social Political Issues in Afghanistan" at the Foreign Service Institute, as well as teaching courses on “Covert Action and Counterintelligence” and “Intelligence and Diplomacy" at Georgetown University’s Center for Security Studies (CSS). Muñoz has lectured on various military, national security, and intelligence topics at National Defense University (Washington D.C.); University of Virginia (Charlottesville); George Mason University (Fairfax), Virginia Commonwealth University (Richmond), Air Command and Staff College (Maxwell Air Force Base), U.S. Army War College (Carlisle), U.S. Marine Corps School of Advanced Warfighting (Quantico), Combined Joint Special Operations Task Force; King's College London (UK); Mexican Intelligence Academy ESISEN (Mexico City).

Muñoz's analysis and commentaries have been aired on international media, cable stations, national television, streamed all over the internet and cited by newspapers/magazines ("Road To 911" History Channel Special Documentary TV Series, NEWSWEEK,  C-SPAN, Reuters, PBS, London Times, The Wall Street Journal, Asia Times Online, BBC, The Washington Post, Associated Press, CBS, MSNBC, CNN Newsroom, New York Times, Financial Times, Voice of America, International Herald Tribune, Al-Jazeera, and other media venues).

Publications and ongoing projects 
 Amazigh: The Berbers of Morocco
 Afghanistan's Local War: Building Local Defense Forces
 
 U.S. Military Information Operations in Afghanistan
 Bent by History in Afghanistan
 Santa Muerte Syncretism
 A Long-Overdue Adaptation to the Afghan Environment
 Response to Why RAND Missed the Point
 Civil defense forces in Afghanistan
 USMIL information operations in Afghanistan
 Taliban strategy and tactics
 Taliban propaganda and psychological operations
 Taliban shadow government
 Assessing Military Information Operations in Afghanistan
 Information Operations: The Imperative of Doctrine Harmonization and Measures of Effectiveness
 Chinese Industrial Espionage: Technology Acquisition and Military Modernization

References

External links
 
 
 
 
 
 “Inside Pakistan’s ISI”, CIA senior intelligence officer Arturo Muñoz examines the scope of the Pakistan's Inter-Service Intelligence (ISI) activities
 "The People in Arms; Understanding Insurgency", Dr. Arturo G. Muñoz
  
 "While Americans Fight the Taliban, Putin Is Making Headway in Afghanistan", NEWSWEEK, 7/2017
 "Road To 911", HISTORY CHANNEL Special Documentary TV Series, 9/2017

American spies
People of the Central Intelligence Agency
Living people
Year of birth missing (living people)